Elachyophtalma kebeae is a moth in the family Bombycidae. It was described by George Thomas Bethune-Baker in 1904. It is found on New Guinea.

The wingspan is 47 mm. The forewings are maroon-chocolate brown, the disc sprinkled with yellowish hairlike scales. There is an indistinct antemedial, strongly zigzag shadow band. The hindwings are maroon-chocolate brown, the inner one-third sprinkled with yellow hair scales.

References

Bombycidae
Moths described in 1904